Kim John Barnett (born 17 July 1960) is a former English cricketer. Barnett was a batsman who played internationally for England between 1988 and 1989.

He was primarily a batsman, but could also deploy effective leg spin, and topped the English first-class bowling averages in 1994 with 13.30, albeit with only thirteen wickets to his name. Barnett was named one of the five Wisden Cricketers of the Year in 1989.

Domestic career
He mainly played for Derbyshire, from 1979 to 1998 and Gloucestershire from 1999 to 2002. He also played for South African teams Boland and Impalas.

Barnett played the bulk of his county cricket career for Derbyshire, and was captain between 1983 and 1995. He remained at the club for several more years, until clashes with players and the county's committee resulted in his leaving for Gloucestershire in 1999. He was disappointed not to be offered a renewal of his contract after the 2002 season, and retired from first-class cricket, although he continued to play in regional league competitions.

Barnett scored 28,593 first-class runs in 479 matches at an average of 40.38, with 61 centuries and a top score of 239 not out, made against Leicestershire. He passed 1000 runs in a single season 16 times, including eleven consecutive seasons between 1983 and 1993.

International career
Barnett played only four Test matches for England, partly as a result of bad fortune and partly of his own choice. He was selected for the 1988/89 tour to India, which was cancelled, and then accepted a place on the Mike Gatting led rebel tour of South Africa in 1989/90, and was immediately banned from Test cricket for three years.

In one-day cricket, according to former Gloucestershire coach John Bracewell, Barnett played a key role in a very successful side:  winning a "double double" in 1999 and 2000 (both the Benson and Hedges Cup and the C&G Trophy, in both seasons), while also pocketing the Sunday League in 2000 ... Key to all this was veteran opener Kim Barnett, who Bracewell described as "like Duckworth-Lewis before it was invented". It was Barnett who would first calculate the par score, then systematically plot the road map to that total.

Coaching career
He was coach of the Minor Counties side, Staffordshire, and played for them on occasion.

Outside cricket
Barnett used to play for Rocester F.C. and Leek Town before football took a back seat for cricket.

References

External links
 

1960 births
Living people
Directors of Cricket
Boland cricketers
Derbyshire cricket captains
England One Day International cricketers
England Test cricketers
English cricketers
Gloucestershire cricketers
Wisden Cricketers of the Year
Sportspeople from Leek, Staffordshire
Staffordshire cricketers
Marylebone Cricket Club cricketers
Test and County Cricket Board XI cricketers
D. H. Robins' XI cricketers
Young England cricketers
Leek Town F.C. players
Rocester F.C. players
English footballers
Association footballers not categorized by position